Cramlington is a town and civil parish in Northumberland, England,
6 miles  (9 kilometres) north of Newcastle upon Tyne, and 10 miles (16 kilometres) north of its city centre. The name suggests a probable founding by the Danes or Anglo-Saxons. The population was 29,405 as of 2011 census data from Northumberland County Council. It sits on the border between Northumberland and North Tyneside with the traffic interchange at Moor Farm, Annitsford, linking the two areas.

The area of East Cramlington lies east of the A189, on the B1326 road that connects the town to Seaton Delaval.

History

The first record of the Manor of Cramlington is from a mention in 1135 when the land was granted to Nicholas de Grenville. A register of early chaplains begins with John the Clerk of Cramlington (c. 1163–1180). The register continues to the present day.

From the 12th century onwards, its history has been mostly rural, incorporating several farms and the parish church of St. Nicholas (built at a cost of £3,000 during 1865–1868 in the Gothic style). During the early 19th century, coal mining with several mine shafts in the immediate vicinity began to change that. In 1813 Collingwood Main Colliery suffered an explosion of firedamp in which 8 people were killed. Six miners were carrying timber through the "old workings" when their candles set fire to firedamp.  The resulting afterdamp and chokedamp resulted in a wider loss of life to men and horses.

The town remained small, however, until 1964 when it was proclaimed a New Town and developers such as William Leech and J.T. Bell developed large housing estates. Those estates have since been named Beaconhill, Collingwood, Eastfield, Mayfield, Shankhouse, Southfield, and Whitelea and the town has effectively become a dormitory town of the much larger city to its south.

During World War I, the North East of England was protected by the No. 36 Home Defence Squadron. The squadron was formed at Cramlington on 1 February 1916 by Capt. R. O. Abercromby, with Cramlington subsequently becoming an important base for military planes and airships. The Airship Station was at Nelson Village. A reference to Cramlington airfield is made in W. E. Johns 1935 book The Black Peril from the extremely popular Biggles series.

Cramlington was the site of two rail accidents. In 1855, the chassis of train's first class carriage failed and in 1926, the Merry Hampton engine and five carriages of the Edinburgh to King's Cross Flying Scotsman express train were derailed by striking miners during the General Strike. The story of the derailment was recounted in the BBC Two programme Yesterday's Witness: The Cramlington Train Wreckers in 1970.

During the BBC Domesday Project in 1986 it was recorded that Cramlington's population was around 30,000.

New town development
The idea of a new town development in Cramlington was first envisaged in 1958.

In June 1961, Northumberland County Council's Planning Committee approved the draft plans to establish what it hoped would be "Britain's first enterprise town." Sponsored by the council, the development was to be carried by a consortium led by William Leech, which had acquired the land. It was predicted to take 20 years, cost £50m and eventually house 40,000 inhabitants across a four square mile site that also included an industrial zone. A one-way road system was proposed, with the waggon ways of the former pits being repurposed as pedestrians paths.

The plan was finally approved by the Minister of Housing and Local Government in January 1963, by which time the estimated population had grown to 48,000 and the cost projected at £60m. It marked the first time a new town had been developed without the establishment of a government-backed development corporation. The planning officer predicted that it should look like a town in five years and be complete in 20 years. The first factory was to be completed by summer 1963.

In October 1964, an advert inviting investment in the development recorded an area of 2,200 acres, 530 of which were for industry.

In 2017, remnants of an Iron Age settlement was discovered on land destined for further housing development. Despite the interest of the town population and the potential to build upon the increasing town profile and interest created by Northumberlandia, Northumberland County Council decided to proceed with the housing development regardless.

Local government
Cramlington Local Government District was created in 1865. Later, the Local Government Act of 1894 established the Cramlington Urban District. This was succeeded by the Seaton Valley Urban District in 1935. From 1 April 1974, Cramlington became a part of Blyth Valley. Responsibilities were transferred to Northumberland County Council from 1 April 2009 as a result of 2009 structural changes to local government in England.

On 5 September 2019, to mark the 10th anniversary of the establishment of Cramlington Town Council, it was agreed to create the position of Town Mayor. The position was awarded to Cllr Loraine De Simone. Loraine has been a Cllr in the Cramlington Village ward since 2017.

The most recent vote saw a Conservative majority in the 2021 Northumberland County Council election.

The election results for the Parish and Town council for Cramlington on 6 May 2021:
 Cramlington East - Phil and Faith Rudd
(Independent) & Elizabeth Mitcheson (Labour)
 Cramlington North - Wayne Daley & Helen Morris (Conservative)
 Cramlington West - Barry Flux & Patricia Heard (Conservative)
 Cramlington Eastfield - Christine Dunbar & Norman Dunbar (Conservative)
 Cramlington South East - Paul Ezhilchelvan & Stephen Garrett (Conservative)
 Cramlington Village - Loraine De Simone & Mark Swinburn (Conservative)

Estates
With the establishment of the new town, the area was arranged into estates, primarily with a designator of the part of the town in which the estate was to be found.

The estates are:

 Nelson Village
High Pit
 Northburn (constructed between the late 1980s and the 1990s)
 Northburn Manor (constructed in the early 2000s)
 Eastfield (constructed primarily in the late 1970s with an estate added in the mid-1990s)
 Westwood (constructed in the early 1980s)
 Southfield Lea (constructed in the early 1970s)
 Southfield Gardens (constructed in the early 2000s)
 Mayfield (partially existing prior to the new town designation but with addition building in the late 1960s)
 Whitelea (one of the earliest of the new town estates, constructed in the late 1960s and early 1970s)
 Barns Park (constructed in the 1970s)
 Parkside (constructed in the 1970s)
 Beacon Hill (constructed in the 1970s)
 Beacon Lane (constructed in the 1970s)
 Collingwood Grange (constructed in the late 1960s)
 Southfield Lea Westerkirk Extension (constructed in the 1980s)
 Bassington Manor (constructed between 2015 and 2017)
 St Nicholas Manor (constructed between 2017 and 2023)
The Fairways and Arcot Manor (currently under construction 2018-)
Foxton Mill and Poppy Springs (currently under construction 2022-)
Collingwood Chase (Constructed in the late 1960s)
Southfield Green (Constructed in the early 1970s)

Economy

Industry
There are several large industrial zones in Cramlington, most to the town's north-west near the sewage treatment plant, housing major pharmaceutical companies including Merck Sharp and Dohme. Other growing chemical companies including Aesica Pharmaceuticals are also present. The Officers Club menswear firm (now owned by Blue Inc), previously had its headquarters and supply warehouse in Cramlington, in part of the old Wilkinson Blade factory while other companies such as GE Oil & Gas also occupy large sites. Start Football is also headquartered in the town.

Wilkinson Sword established the first factory in the town in 1964. American Air Filter Company later built premises. Brentford Nylons also opened a large site in the town in 1968.

Boots, the pharmaceuticals manufacturer, opened their plant in Cramlington in 1983.

Retail
The Manor Walks shopping centre was constructed in the centre of the town in the 1970s, and was subsequently expanded in the mid-1990s and in 2003/4. The centre now includes retailers such as Argos, Asda, Boots, Boyes, Next and Sainsbury's. In 2011, plans were put forward to revamp the main center and build a new cinema. The scheme also includes improved retail facilities, restaurants and cafes and more car parking spaces.

Manor Walks was extended into the southern car park in 2012 / 2013 and a new Vue Cinema and two new restaurants opened in July 2013. This coincided with the re-opening of a prominent pub in the town (previously the Traveller's Rest but now named John the Clerk of Cramlington). It is hoped that these developments will boost the town's leisure and visitor economies.

The Brockwell Centre, built in 1990 towards the north of the town, consists of a small range of shops and food outlets, alongside a public house, care home and medical centre. A supermarket, built for Netto, but subsequently owned by Somerfield and The Co-operative Group, is presently occupied by Home Bargains.

Healthcare
Northumbria Healthcare NHS Foundation Trust opened the first hospital in England purpose-built for emergency care in the town in June 2015. The Northumbria Specialist Emergency Care Hospital cost £75 million. It has emergency care consultants on duty at all times, and a range of specialists available seven days a week. In February 2021, the NHS trust began court action against contractor Lendlease over structural defects identified in the building. A trial is due to start in October 2022.

Landmarks
Plessey Woods Country Park lies just to the north of Cramlington, with the River Blyth flowing through the country park. Northumberlandia, a huge land sculpture in the shape of a reclining female figure is located on the outskirts of Cramlington. Within the town itself, Nelson Hill is a prominent landmark to the north of the town centre. Arcot Hall Grasslands and Ponds SSSI is situated to the south-east of the town.

Transport

The town is served by Cramlington Railway Station which is on the East Coast Main Line, with services to the MetroCentre, Morpeth and Newcastle upon Tyne provided by Northern.

It is also served by a number of bus operators including Arriva North East which provides express services to Newcastle upon Tyne, Morpeth and Blyth, as well as Go North East which runs services to and from North Shields.

Cramlington also has good road transport links, being situated between the A1, A19 and A189 roads.

In line with many of the UK's post-war New Towns, Cramlington has an extensive bicycle network.

Education
Until September 2008, all schools in Northumberland operated under a three tier system, however, following a decision to convert the county to a two tier system, Cramlington was chosen as one of the first towns to complete this. Prior to the closure of the area's many middle schools,  some primary schools relocated to the former middle school sites. There had been concern from local residents over traffic and parking arrangements at the new sites.

Other schools in Cramlington are listed as follows: Hareside Primary School, Hillcrest School, Shanklea Primary School, Burnside Primary School, Cragside Church of England Primary School, Northburn Primary School, Eastlea Primary School, Beaconhill Primary School and SS Peter and Paul's Catholic Primary Academy.

Cramlington Learning Village

In September 2008 Cramlington Community High School was renamed Cramlington Learning Village as it gained two new year groups in line with the move to a two tier system. The village has three sections: the Junior Learning Village (for Years 7 and 8), the Senior Learning Village (for Years 9 to 11) and the Advanced Learning Village (for Years 12 and 13). The school was rated outstanding in four successive Ofsted inspections, however in July 2015, this rating was lowered to 'inadequate'. In February 2017, this was raised to 'Good'. In July 2022, the school was to be chosen to be part of the Government’s School Rebuilding Programme, which could involve a state-of-the-art rebuild or refurbishment to the derelict 1960s buildings.

Religious sites
Cramlington has a number of Christian churches of various denominations:

Methodist
 Doxford Place Methodist Church
 Welcome Methodist Church (formerly Station Terrace Methodist Church)

Church of England
 St. Nicholas Parish Church
 St. Andrew's
 St. Peter's

Roman Catholic
 St. Paul's

Others
 Church of the Nazarene
 Frontline
 Open Episcopal Church

Leisure

Leisure centre
Cramlington's main leisure centre, Concordia, is situated in the town centre adjacent to the shopping mall and was opened by Queen Elizabeth II in July 1977. It features a leisure pool, originally designed as an indoor tropical paradise, indoor football pitches, tennis, badminton and squash courts, as well as a climbing wall. It also includes a gymnasium, sauna, bowling green, bar and cafeteria. It was refurbished in 2008, particularly to improve disabled access.  The pool was also refurbished in 2011. A major refurbishment began in 2016, with the addition of new facilities and the improvement of existing ones. Most recently, in 2019, a major pool refurbishment took place with changes including replacing the old pool lining and the swimming pool floor areas in the wet changing rooms and around the children’s poolside water features.

Cycle paths
A large cycle path network, completely separate from the road network, was a key part of the new town design. A cycle route also connects the town to the nearest beach, in Blyth. In March 2007, Blyth Valley Borough Council announced that the cycle network was to be extended to allow access to the neighbouring town of Bedlington.

Public houses
The village square is home to four public houses, including the Grade II listed Blagdon Arms.

Sport

Cramlington United was established in 2010 and they were awarded Community Club Status 12 months later. Their home ground is based at Northburn Sports & Community Centre. They are currently in Northern Football Alliance Division 2.

Arcot Hall Golf Club is located to the south of the town.

Cramlington Rockets are a Rugby League team based in Cramlington. Initially, the club was formed in 2000 as Killingworth Rockets ARLFC. They are based on the fields of the Cramlington Learning Village. Their 1st team is currently in the North East Division of the Rugby League Conference.

Twin towns
As part of the former Blyth Valley borough, Cramlington participates in a town twinning scheme with three other towns — two in Germany and one in the Russian Federation.

Notable residents
 Charles Fenwick, trade unionist
 Sam Heads, entomologist and palaeontologist
 Ross Noble, comedian
 Ray Stevenson, actor
 Sting, musician, from 1974 to 1976, was a schoolteacher at  St Paul's Roman Catholic Voluntary Aided First School

Football
 Joe Brown, football player in the 1940s and 1950s, Burnley manager
 James Brown, Hartlepool United striker was born in Cramlington
 Steven Caldwell, former Newcastle United defender and Burnley captain and Scotland international, once lived in the town's centre while he was at Newcastle
 John Carver, former footballer, previously assistant manager at Newcastle United
 Mark Clattenburg, Premier League referee
 Peter Haddock, professional football player lived in Cramlington; most notable for playing for Leeds United, he also played for Newcastle United and Burnley
 Jimmy Isaac, footballer in the 1930s and 1940s for Huddersfield Town
 Jamie McClen, footballer
 Michael Oliver, youngest ever Premier League referee, resides in Cramlington
 Ray Pointer (1936-2016), footballer: Burnley and England. Born Cramlington.
 Peter Ramage played youth football for Cramlington Juniors F.C.
 Alan Shearer, played youth football for Cramlington Juniors F.C.
 Andy Sinton, former Queens Park Rangers, Sheffield Wednesday and Spurs footballer
 Martin Taylor, professional footballer currently with Sheffield Wednesday; attended Cramlington High School
 Steven Taylor played youth football for Cramlington Juniors F.C.

Other sports
 Stephen Miller, Paralympic triple Gold Medalist comes from Cramlington
 Gary Robson, professional darts player
 Roger Uttley, former England national Rugby Union player, was a sports teacher at Cramlington High School
Neil Decarteret (UK POG champion 2000, 2001) after dominating the first two UK championships the fame and fortune got too much and he became a recluse. In 2020 there was talk of him coming out of retirement and attempting to become the only three time UK POG champion in history, but a lack of people playing in the UK brought this dream to an end.

References

External links

 
 Northumberland Communities Photos and maps of Cramlington from 1610–1910.

 
Towns in Northumberland
Civil parishes in Northumberland